Adam Hood is a singer-songwriter from Opelika, Alabama.  His music is in the style of [Americana|Roots), Americana, and roots rock.

Career
Hood's 2007 album Different Groove was produced with Pete Anderson. In 2007, Hood opened for Taylor Hicks, performed at Diversafest in Tulsa and at the Austin City Limits Music Festival, and was seen in a segment of We're An American Band on the Documentary Channel. Hood's music video for "Hell of a Fight" ranked No. 5 on the CMT front page main category "Todays Top Videos" on February 18, 2012. Hood has toured with artists such as Pat Green, Todd Snider, Miranda Lambert, Leon Russell and Ian Moore.

He was on the Willie Nelson Throwdown Tour for the summer of 2011 as part of the Bluebird Cafe singer-songwriter group.

Hood was signed with Carnival Records and was a songwriter for Carnival Music Publishing for 6 years.

In January 2015, Rolling Stone mentioned Hood as a top 10 country artists listeners should know.

Hood is in a co-publishing deal with Low Country Sound & Warner/Chappell Music.

Discography

 21 to Enter (2002), Adam Hood Music
 6th Street (EP) (2004)
 Different Groove (2007), Little Dog Records
 Different Groove (2009), with 3 bonus tracks, Saguaro Road Records
 Adam Hood (EP) (2011)
 The Shape of Things (2011), Carnival Records
 Welcome to the Big World (2014), Adam Hood Music
 Somewhere in Between (2018), Adam Hood Music
 Bad Days Better (2022), Southern Songs

Music videos

References

External links
 
 
 Little Dog Records

People from Opelika, Alabama
Year of birth missing (living people)
American country singer-songwriters
Living people
Country musicians from Alabama
Singer-songwriters from Alabama